WNQM, or Nashville Quality Ministries, is a Christian radio station located in Nashville, Tennessee and owned by F. W. Robbert Broadcasting.

History
The station was founded in 1948 as WMAK by the Texas newspaper publisher Frank W. Mayborn of Temple, Texas.

From December 1962 through the 1970s WMAK became a TOP 40 chart music station. Promotion and stunts made the station competitive in the Nashville radio market. Before this time WKDA had been the dominant TOP 40 station in Nashville, helmed by Jack Stapp a local music publisher and owner of TREE Music Publishing in Nashville. With the installation of Ralley Stanton as Program Director of WMAK, WMAK became competitive and Fred Gregg the owner (who also owned WAKY in Louisville, Kentucky) helped put WMAK into a competitive position by installing a new 5K RCA transmitter. With the new sound and complete coverage in the Middle Tennessee market WMAK reached number two in the Pulse Rating Service and number Three in the Monthly Hooper Ratings. Air staff were known as the "WMAK Tigers," and at that time included: Allen (Dennis) and Alan (Nelson - the News Director)in the morning. Gene Clark Middays 9AM-2PM, Jay Reynolds 2PM to 6PM, Frank Jolley 6 PM-Midnight.  They were rivals to the then-identically formatted Nashville AM station WKDA, who were known as the "Good Guys." WMAK signed off at midnight until later in the sixties when Scott Shannon became Program Director and took the station full time and installing his new brand of Top 40 Radio in the station. WMAK became the number one rated radio station under the tutelage of Scott Shannon.  In August 1978, the station adopted a disco format and was known as "Majik 13". During the run of the disco format, WMAK was fully automated. On January 1, 1980, disco was dropped and WMAK's format became oldies. WMAK dropped the automation and brought back live DJs.(The oldies format and callsign were later revived in 2000 by WMAK-FM (which is now the Jack FM station WCJK).

On June 22, 1982, it became WLUY, "Lucky 13", and was largely run by students of Nashville Radio School. The station went dark in 1983. That year, F. W. Robbert Broadcasting bought the station and on February 2, 1984, it began broadcasting with its current format.

External links
WNQM official site

FCC History Cards for WNQM

NQM
NQM
Radio stations established in 1948
1948 establishments in Tennessee